Chalambar (also Romanized as Chelambar, Chhīlambar, and Chīlambar) is a village in Sagezabad Rural District, in the Central District of Buin Zahra County, Qazvin Province, Iran. At the 2006 census, its population was 108, in 26 families.

References 

Populated places in Buin Zahra County